Matej Krušič is a Slovenian professional basketball player. Standing at 208 cm, he last played for KK Šentjur in the Liga Nova KBM.

References 
Basketball association of Slovenia
USK Praha

1987 births
Living people
Centers (basketball)
Greek Basket League players
Sportspeople from Celje
Slovenian men's basketball players
CB Peñas Huesca players